Echeveria pulvinata, the plush plant, is a species of flowering plant in the genus Echeveria, native to southwest and central Mexico. A succulent, it has gained the Royal Horticultural Society's Award of Garden Merit. Its variety Echeveria pulvinata var. leucotricha, under the synonym Echeveria leucotricha, the chenille plant, has also gained the Award of Garden Merit.

Subtaxa
The following varieties are currently accepted:
Echeveria pulvinata var. frigida Kimnach
Echeveria pulvinata var. leucotricha (J.A.Purpus) Kimnach

References

pulvinata
Succulent plants
Endemic flora of Mexico
Plants described in 1903
Taxa named by Joseph Nelson Rose